Brudesløret is a waterfall in Haukå which is located in Kinn Municipality in Vestland county, Norway. It is located near Norwegian county road 614, just north of the Norddalsfjorden. It is a single-drop horsetail waterfall.

References 

Waterfalls of Vestland
Kinn